= Donaerodorstroy =

- Founded: 1956
- Headquarters: Moscow, Russia
- Products: road construction
- Number of employees: 3000

Donaerodorstroy (full name: Joint Stock Company for Construction and Reconstruction of Highways and Airfields) is a Russian company, one of the largest construction companies in the country. It is a part of OJSC "Group of construction companies "DON".

It specializes in comprehensive construction of roads with asphalt and cement concrete pavement, bridges and overpasses, airfields and hydraulic structures.

The company is headquartered in Moscow.

== History ==
The company was founded in 1956. The first task was to create a backbone network of intercity and inter-settlement roads in the Rostov region.

In 1960-1970s due to the construction of public roads Moscow-Volgograd and Moscow-Kharkiv-Simferopol 3 construction units and 2 depots were transferred to the Volgograd and Kharkiv regions.

In 1984, the company was awarded the Red Banner of the Ministry of Construction of the USSR and the Central Committee of the Trade Union of workers of road transport and highways.

In 1992, the Trust "Dondorstrstroy" was incorporated and received the name "Donaerodorstrstroy".

In 2005, DONAERODORSTROY JSC became a part of DON Group of Construction Companies.

In 2020, by the decision of the Russian government Donaerodorstroy JSC was included in the list of backbone organizations of the Russian economy. The head office of Donaerodorstroy was relocated to Moscow.

In 2021, Donaerodorstroy became one of the founders of the National Association of Infrastructure Companies (NAIC).

== Activity ==
The company implements projects in the Rostov, Volgograd, Vladimir, Novgorod, Sverdlovsk, Chelyabinsk regions, the Krasnodar Territory, the Republic of Bashkortostan.

In the Soviet era there were built such roads as Rostov-Ordzhonikidze, Rostov-Novocherkassk, Rostov-Olginsk-Volgodonsk, Debaltsevo-Luhansk, Moscow-Volgograd, Moscow-Kharkiv-Simferopol, Novocherkassk, etc.

The company built airfields in Rostov-on-Don, Volgograd, Taganrog, Volgodonsk. The total construction area is more than 1,042 thousand square meters.

In 2006 the road "Morozovsk - Tsimlyansk - Volgodonsk" with a bridge crossing over the Don was built.

From 2008 to 2019 over 400 km of federal highway M-4 "Don" was reconstructed and built.

In 2015, a four-lane highway "Rostov - Azov" was built.

In 2017, the road "Approach to Platov Airport" was built, the federal highway A-260 "Volgograd - Ukraine" and the federal highway R-22 "Caspian Sea" (M-4 - Tambov - Volgograd - Astrakhan) were reconstructed.

In 2021, Donaerodorstroy started construction of the 3rd stage of the Rostov-on-Don Northern Bypass.

In 2020, the construction of the Southern Bypass in the village of Leningradskaya and reconstruction of the 3rd stage of the Rostov bypass ("Aksai Bypass") in the section of 1024–1036 km were carried out.

In 2021, there was construction of the Volgograd City Bypass, and the Krasnodar Far Western Bypass. This is the largest contract in the history of the company with a cost of 41.5 billion rubles.

== Structure and management ==
The company owns 9 production bases, 13 stationary and mobile asphalt plants, 5 plants for the production of concrete, 10 bitumen storage, 6 access railroads, 6 own laboratories.

The general director is Ivanov Vladimir Yurievich.

The number of employees of the company overpasses 13 000 people.
